See Kee Oon (born 1966) is a Singaporean judge who is currently a Judge of the Supreme Court and was the Presiding Judge of the State Courts.

Education
See received a Bachelor of Laws from the National University of Singapore (NUS) in 1991 and obtained a Master of Laws (first class honours) from the University of Cambridge in 1994. He also holds a Master of Public Management from the NUS's Lee Kuan Yew School of Public Policy.

Career
See joined the Singapore Legal Service in 1991 and was appointed as a Deputy Registrar and Magistrate in the Subordinate Courts (now State Courts). From 1995 to 1997, he served as a Justices' Law Clerk before becoming a District Judge in 1998. As a District Judge, he heard a variety of cases in the criminal, civil and family courts until 2007, when he became Head of the Insolvency and Public Trustee's Office. In November 2009, See was reappointed as a District Judge and subsequently made Senior District Judge, heading the Criminal Justice Division of the Subordinate Courts.

On 1 October 2013, See became the Chief District Judge of the Subordinate Courts and a member of a committee to guide the development of the Singapore University of Social Sciences's School of Law. On 14 April 2014, he was appointed as a Judicial Commissioner and Presiding Judge of the State Courts. On 31 January 2017, he was promoted to Judge of the Supreme Court.

See has taken the unusual position that testifying witnesses are not required to be given an oath or otherwise instructed to tell the truth. Instead, he contends that the Oaths and Declarations Act "gives the judge the prerogative whether to caution a witness ["to speak the truth"] or not," resulting in a greater likelihood of wrongful convictions.

One case presided by See was the trial of Gaiyathiri Murugayan, who was charged with the abuse and murder of Piang Ngaih Don, a Myanmar national who was her domestic maid. Gaiyathiri was found guilty of culpable homicide not amounting to murder and voluntarily causing hurt to the maid, and sentenced to a total of 30 years' imprisonment. See described the case as one of the worst cases of culpable homicide Singapore has ever seen, and described that the degree of callousness and violence was so shocking that no suitable words could adequately describe the inhumane year-long mistreatment, assault and starvation, which the maid was subjected to.

See was also the judge who heard the last-minute appeals by two Malaysian drug traffickers Pannir Selvam Pranthaman and Nagaenthran K. Dharmalingam in 2020 and 2021 respectively, as they sought to reopen their cases and delay their executions. Both Pannir and Nagaenthran lost their appeals and remained on death row; Nagaenthran was initially set to be executed on 10 November 2021 before it was delayed due to Nagaenthran tested positive for COVID-19. Nagaenthran was hanged on 27 April 2022.

References

External links
State Courts Annual Report 2013: Renewing our Commitment to Justice State Courts Annual Report 2013: Renewing our Commitment to Justice

1966 births
Singaporean people of Hokkien descent
Living people
National University of Singapore alumni
Alumni of Hughes Hall, Cambridge
Singaporean people of Chinese descent
Judges of the Supreme Court of Singapore